Lough Cutra Castle is a privately owned castle located near Gort in south County Galway, Ireland. The castle was designed by English architect John Nash for Colonel Charles Vereker, 2nd Viscount Gort. Construction started in 1811 and was completed in 1817.

Location
The lake is 1000 acres in size and is Europe's largest privately owned lake. 

The Lough Cutra Castle Triathlon which is part of the Castle Race Series has been held every May since 2012 in the grounds of the castle with the grounds open to the public for the event.

Visitors
During their state visit to Ireland in May 2015, future king Prince Charles and Camilla stayed at the castle over three days and hosted a state dinner for 18 guests in the castle dining room, guests included the President of Ireland, Michael D. Higgins and his wife Sabina.

References

External links
Official Site

Castles in County Galway